Kaung Htet Soe (born ၁ စက္တင္ဘာ ၁၉၉၇; 1 September 1997) is a footballer from Burma, and an attacker for Kamphaengphet. He was born in Amarapura, Mandalay.He is a shinning star of Yangon United.

Club career
Kaung Htet Soe started play at Yangon United Youth team in 2015. During 2016 and 2017, he showed his impressive talent and trained with Yangon United senior team. In 2018 MNL U-21 season, he became a captain of Yangon United and showed his talent again. Before 2019 MNL season, Yangon United Coach Myo Min Tun took him and signed for Yangon United senior team. His first international goal is against Ceres–Negros. and his first goal of MNL is against Yadanarbon FC

References

1997 births
Living people
Burmese footballers
Myanmar international footballers
Yangon United F.C. players
Association football defenders
Competitors at the 2019 Southeast Asian Games
Southeast Asian Games medalists in football
Southeast Asian Games bronze medalists for Myanmar